BOR-A 550 is a ground and coast surveillance radar, developed by Thales Group. The radar operates on the I band, it is also man-portable and can locate targets up to a distance of 40 km in a 360° sector. It has also proven useful to locate small and slow targets, like persons or rubber boats.

The BOR-A 560 is a more powerful version with longer range.

External links

Signal - Digitized signals allow versatile tactical radio units, networked radar systems and wireless command posts.
Thales brochure

Ground radars